The discography of British musician and producer Labrinth consists of two studio albums, one soundtrack album, two extended plays (EPs), twenty singles and fourteen music videos.

The musician released his debut single, "Let the Sun Shine", in September 2010 where it peaked at number three on the UK Singles Chart; also reaching number thirty-two on the Irish Singles Chart. A second single, "Earthquake", was released in November 2011 debuting at number two in the UK; with first week sales of over 115,000 copies. The track attained international chart success, reaching number twelve in Ireland, number five in New Zealand and number four in Australia; also attaining double platinum and platinum statuses from the Australian Recording Industry Association and the Recording Industry Association of New Zealand respectively. Labrinth's debut studio album, Electronic Earth, was released on 2 April 2012 peaking at number two behind Nicki Minaj's Pink Friday: Roman Reloaded. The release was preceded by "Last Time", which became the artist's third consecutive top five hit in the UK; peaking at number four. A further three singles were released from the album, "Express Yourself", "Treatment", which peaked at number twelve and number fifty respectively– and "Beneath Your Beautiful" featuring Emeli Sandé (November 2012) which became Labrinth's first number-one single in both the UK and Ireland.

Labrinth has also appeared as a featuring artist on several occasions, notably alongside rapper Tinie Tempah. The pair first collaborated on the track "Pass Out" which having been released in February 2010 topped the UK chart; also reaching number six in Ireland. A second collaboration, "Frisky", was released several months later peaking at number two in the UK and number three in Ireland. The musician has also appeared as a featuring artist on Devlin's single "Let It Go" and as part of 'The Collective' on the Children in Need record "Teardrop" which peaked at number fifty-nine and number twenty-four in the UK respectively.

In 2019, Labrinth composed the score to the HBO teen drama Euphoria. The season 1 score album became his first charting album on the US Billboard 200 and entered the top 50 in several countries including Australia, Canada, and Ireland. Album track "Still Don't Know My Name" became a sleeper hit in 2020 and earned Labrinth his first Platinum single in the US. Later in the year he released his second studio album Imagination & the Misfit Kid.

Albums

Studio albums

Soundtrack albums

Extended plays

Singles

As lead artist

As featured artist

Promotional singles

Charity singles

Other charted songs

Guest appearances

Music videos

Songwriting and production credits

Remixes
 2010: Gorillaz featuring Bobby Womack, Mos Def and Tinie Tempah – "Stylo (Labrinth SNES Remix)"
 2010: Jessie J – "Do It like a Dude"
 2011: Loick Essien – "Love Drunk"
 2012: Birdy Nam Nam – "Written in the Sand"
 2013: Conor Maynard – "R U Crazy"

Notes

References

Discographies of British artists
Pop music discographies
Hip hop discographies